Balchladich is a remote township in the Assynt district of  Sutherland, Scottish Highlands and is in the Scottish council area of Highland.

References

Populated places in Sutherland